Grad Damen is a Dutch singer and tattoo artist.

His grandfather Gerrie and cousin also called Grad were both footballers.

References

Year of birth missing (living people)
Date of birth missing (living people)
Living people
Dutch singers